Bayfield is a surname. Notable people with the surname include:

Henry Wolsey Bayfield (1795–1885), English Royal Navy admiral
M. A. Bayfield (1852–1922), English classical scholar, educator and Anglican priest
Martin Bayfield (born 1966), English rugby union player
Richard Bayfield (died 1531), English Protestant martyr
Robert Bayfield, 17th-century English physician
St. Clair Bayfield (1875–1967), American actor
Tony Bayfield (born 1946), British Reform rabbi

English-language surnames